
British NVC community MG10 (Holcus lanatus – Juncus effusus rush-pasture) is one of the mesotrophic grassland communities in the British National Vegetation Classification system.  It is one of three communities associated with poorly drained permanent pastures.

It is a widespread community throughout the British lowlands. There are three subcommunities.

Community composition

The following constant species are found in this community:
 Creeping Bent (Agrostis stolonifera)
 Yorkshire-fog (Holcus lanatus)
 Soft Rush (Juncus effusus)
 Creeping Buttercup (Ranunculus repens)

No rare species are associated with this community.

Distribution

This community is widespread in England and Wales; in Scotland it is more localised, being found only in the south and east.

Subcommunities

There are three subcommunities:
 the so-called typical subcommunity
 the Juncus inflexus subcommunity
 the Iris pseudoacorus subcommunity

References

 Rodwell, J. S. (1992) British Plant Communities Volume 3 – Grasslands and montane communities  (hardback),  (paperback)

MG10